The field hockey tournament at the 1964 Summer Olympics was the 10th edition of the field hockey event for men at the Summer Olympic Games. It was held from 11 to 23 October 1964. All games were played at the Komazawa Hockey Field in Tokyo, Japan.

Pakistan were the defending champions, but lost 1–0 to India in the Gold-medal match.

Australia won their first Olympic medal, claiming bronze in a 3–2 win over Spain in extra time.

Medalists

Squads

Results

Preliminary round

Pool A

Pool B

Classification round

Crossover

Fifth and sixth place

Medal round

Semi-finals

Bronze-medal match

Gold-medal match

Final rankings

Goalscorers

References

Sources
 

 
Field hockey at the Summer Olympics
1964 Summer Olympics events
Summer Olympics
1964 Summer Olympics